Artem Khotsyanovskyi (born 20 October 1998) is a professional Ukrainian football striker.

Career
Born in Zhytomyr, Khotsyanovskyi is a product of the Polissya Zhytomyr, Dynamo Kyiv and UFK Lviv sportive schools.

In summer 2015 Khotsyanovskyi signed contract with FC Stal Kamianske and played in the Ukrainian Premier League Reserves. He made his debut in the Ukrainian Premier League for Stal Kamianske on 5 August 2017, playing in a match against FC Karpaty Lviv.

References

External links 

1998 births
Living people
Footballers from Zhytomyr
Ukrainian footballers
FC Stal Kamianske players
Ukrainian Premier League players
Association football forwards
FC Dynamo Kyiv players
FC Kramatorsk players
FC Hirnyk-Sport Horishni Plavni players
NK Veres Rivne players
FC Kremin Kremenchuk players
Ukrainian Second League players
Sportspeople from Zhytomyr Oblast